The Asian qualifying competition for 2021 FIFA Futsal World Cup was an extraordinary men's futsal competition that determines two of the five national teams which are members of the Asian Football Confederation (AFC) playing in the 2021 FIFA Futsal World Cup in Lithuania, which was originally scheduled to be held in 2020 but postponed to 2021 due to the COVID-19 pandemic.

The matches were played at the neutral venue of Khorfakkan Futsal Club Hall in Khor Fakkan, United Arab Emirates between 20 and 25 May 2021.

Format
The five AFC teams playing in the 2021 FIFA Futsal World Cup would originally be determined by the 2020 AFC Futsal Championship, with the top five teams qualifying. Following the cancellation of the championship due to the COVID-19 pandemic, the AFC announced on 21 April 2021 that they agreed to two sets of criteria of establishing the AFC representatives for the 2021 FIFA Futsal World Cup. The first criteria took reference from the top five teams of the most recent edition (2018), while the second criteria applied a point system which calculates the top five teams from the overall ranking of the last three editions of the AFC Futsal Championship (2014, 2016, 2018). 

Based on the results of combined criteria, the top three recurring teams (Iran, Japan, and Uzbekistan) were directly nominated as the AFC representatives for the 2021 FIFA Futsal World Cup. Additionally, the four remaining teams: Iraq (although had not qualified for the 2020 AFC Futsal Championship formerly), Lebanon, Thailand, and Vietnam would play play-off matches over two legs. The two winners would qualify for the 2021 FIFA Futsal World Cup. Although all matches were eventually played at a neutral venue, the away goals rule would still be applied.

Draw
The draw was held on 27 April 2021, 16:00 MST (UTC+8), at the AFC House in Kuala Lumpur, Malaysia. The four teams (Iraq, Lebanon, Thailand, and Vietnam) were drawn into two pairings. The team drawn first in each pairing would be the home team for the first leg, and the team drawn second in each pairing would be the home team for the second leg.

Summary
The first legs were played on 20 and 23 May, and the second legs on 25 May 2021.

Matches

Thailand won 11–2 on aggregate and qualified for the 2021 FIFA Futsal World Cup.

1–1 on aggregate. Vietnam won on away goals and qualified for the 2021 FIFA Futsal World Cup.

Goalscorers

Qualified teams for FIFA Futsal World Cup
The following five teams from AFC qualify for the 2021 FIFA Futsal World Cup.

1 Bold indicates champions for that year. Italic indicates hosts for that year.

See also
2020 AFC Futsal Championship

References

External links
FIFA Futsal World Cup, the-AFC.com
FIFA Futsal World Cup 2021, stats.the-AFC.com

Afc
qualification
May 2021 sports events in Asia
International futsal competitions hosted by the United Arab Emirates